The Boone Community School District is a public school district headquartered in Boone, Iowa. 

The district, entirely within Boone County, serves Boone and the surrounding rural areas.

Julie Trepa became superintendent in 2020, after serving as a shared superintendent at West Monona and West Harrison schools districts.

Schools
The district operates five schools, all in Boone:
 Boone High School
 Boone Middle School
 Franklin Elementary School
 Lincoln Elementary School
 Page Elementary School

See also
List of school districts in Iowa

References

External links
 Boone Community School District
School districts in Iowa
Education in Boone County, Iowa